The list of ship decommissionings in 1973 includes a chronological list of all ships decommissioned in 1973.

See also

1973
 Ship decommissionings
Ship